Salfia Muslim Institute is a higher secondary school located at Parray Pora, Srinagar, Jammu and Kashmir. The school runs under the non-profit organisation Jamiat-e-Ahle Hadith J&K. It is one of the schools of 'Trans World Muslim University'.

History
The institution was established in 1989 and was located at Tengpora. In 1994 the school relocated to a rented building at Parray Pora, Srinagar. Subsequently, it merged with King Faisal, in 1996  and was shifted to a school-owned building at Parray Pora.

About
The school is currently working under Mr Nisar Ahmad  dar, also principal of the institution. The school has two science labs, one computer lab and two halls mostly used for exams and occasionally for other processions. The school works under the supervision of Master Mohammed  yousuf sahib

References

Schools in Srinagar
Education in Srinagar